RTL Deutschland (formerly known as Mediengruppe RTL Deutschland) is a German media company based in Cologne, North Rhine-Westphalia. It was founded in 2007 as a holding company for the German television, broadcasting and content production businesses of the RTL Group, which is majority-owned by Bertelsmann.

On 14 June 2021 it was announced that the Mediengruppe RTL Deutschland will be renamed in September 2021 as part of a re-branding to RTL Deutschland. In this context, both the company and the broadcaster RTL will get new logos and a new design.

History 
In 2000, Bertelsmann and Pearson announced that they would merge their television and radio stations and production companies. This created RTL Group, based in Luxembourg, as a leading European media company. RTL's activities in Germany were also affected by this merger; Bertelsmann had gradually increased its stake in the German television broadcaster RTL in the 1990s.

In 2007, television and content businesses in Germany were bundled under the umbrella of Mediengruppe RTL Deutschland. The company introduced a new brand identity and bundled digital competencies. 

In 2009, RTL, VOX, N-tv, and other programs moved into a joint broadcasting center in Cologne-Deutz, to achieve synergy effects not only organizationally but also through physical proximity. One example of successful cooperation between the companies of Mediengruppe RTL Deutschland is the streaming platform TV NOW. Initially launched by RTL, other channels were successively added to the service.

At Bertelsmann, Mediengruppe RTL Deutschland established further partnerships with other divisions, such as for marketing (Ad Alliance) and content production (Content Alliance). 

In 2021, it was announced that Gruner + Jahr and Mediengruppe RTL Deutschland intend to cooperate even more closely in the future.

Businesses 
Mediengruppe RTL Deutschland positioned itself as a motion picture provider that conceives, produces, and plays out content independently of specific platforms. Its focus has traditionally been on traditional television; simultaneously, its online platforms and those operated by third parties have become increasingly important. 

Noteworthy entertainment channels are RTL and VOX, among others. Both continuously achieve high market shares in all target groups. The majority of their programming consists of self-developed formats and in-house productions, supplemented by international series and shows. News and documentaries play an important role at Mediengruppe RTL Deutschland, too; NTV is one of the leading news channels in Germany. More than 700 employees work for the entire media group in journalistic functions at 11 German and 15 international locations.

Operations 
Mediengruppe RTL Deutschland GmbH operates as a limited liability company (Gesellschaft mit beschränkter Haftung). Its corporate purpose essentially extends to looking after the overarching interests of the individual companies, as well as all related activities. The holding generates a large part of its revenues from advertising. In addition, there is revenue from licenses for content conceived and produced on behalf of third parties; subscriptions to offerings such as TV NOW account for another share.

Notes and references

External links 
  

Mass media companies of Germany
Companies based in Cologne
Companies based in North Rhine-Westphalia
Mass media in Cologne
Bertelsmann subsidiaries
Television networks in Germany
German-language television networks